Jaspar is a surname. Notable people with the surname include:

Bobby Jaspar (1926–1963) cool jazz and hard bop saxophonist, flautist and composer born in Liège, Belgium
Henri Jaspar (1870–1939) Belgian Catholic Party politician and prime-minister
Jules Jaspar (1878–1963) Belgian Consul
Marcel-Henri Jaspar (1901–1982) Belgian diplomat
Jaspar von Oertzen (1912–2008), German stage, film and television actor
Jaspar Yu Woon Chai (born 1988), Bruneian badminton player

See also
JASPAR, a database of transcription factor (TF) binding profiles
Spelling variant of Caspar, one of the Three Biblical Magi
Jasper
Jaspur
Jesper